Hydrogenoxalate or hydrogen oxalate is an anion with chemical formula  or , derived from oxalic acid by the loss of a single proton; or, alternatively, from the oxalate anion  by addition of a proton. The name is also used for any salt containing this anion. Especially in older literature, hydrogenoxalates may also be referred to as bioxalates, acid oxalates, or monobasic oxalates. Hydrogenoxalate is amphoteric, in that it can react both as an acid or a base.

Well characterized salts include sodium hydrogenoxalate (), potassium hydrogenoxalate (), ammonium hydrogenoxalate (), rubidium hydrogenoxalate () and dimethylammonium hydrogenoxalate (()).

Structure 
Most hydrogenoxalate salts are hydrated. For example, potassium hydrogen oxalate crystallizes as 2·. These materials exhibit extended structures resulting from extensive hydrogen bonding and anion-cation interactions. The hydrates dehydrate upon heating:
2· → 2 + 
Proton transfer in hydrogen oxalates has been studied.

See also
Bicarbonate

References

Carboxylate anions